Chor Lau-heung is a Taiwanese television series adapted from Gu Long's Chu Liuxiang novel series. The story is a new creation by the screenwriters and has little relevance to the original novels. Adam Cheng starred as the titular protagonist, Chor Lau-heung (Cantonese for "Chu Liuxiang"). The series was first broadcast on TTV in Taiwan on 3 April 1995.

Cast
 Adam Cheng as Chu Liuxiang
 Cynthia Khan as Shangguan Wuji
 Shen Meng-sheng as Hu Tiehua
 Kang Kai as Ji Bingyan
 Hsia Kuang-li as Princess Shengnian
 Chen Ya-lan as Gao Yanan
 Yang Chiung-hua as Qiuxin
 Huang Chian-chun as Prince Zhaoming
 Lin Mei-chen as Su Rongrong
 Chang Hsin-yueh as Li Hongxiu
 Huang Hsiao-ching as Song Tian'er
 Huang Hsiao-lung as A'bu
 Li Chuan-chung as Bai Dilun
 Hao Man-li as Bao Yudai
 Li Ching-fang as King of Dalibisi
 Meng Ting-li as Lian Nichang
 Cheng Ping-chun as Tianfeng Shisilang
 Kang Tian-hung as Sun Moon Cult leader

External links
  Chor Lau-heung on TTV's website

1995 Taiwanese television series debuts
1995 Taiwanese television series endings
Taiwanese wuxia television series
Works based on Chu Liuxiang (novel series)
1990s Taiwanese television series
Television shows based on works by Gu Long